Craig Aaron Rocastle (born 17 August 1981) is a former professional footballer who played as a midfielder.

A former youth team player at Queens Park Rangers, he joined Kingstonian from Gravesend and Northfleet in 2001. He signed with Chelsea via Slough Town in 2003, and was loaned out to Barnsley, Lincoln City, and Hibernian. He joined Sheffield Wednesday in February 2005, helping the "Owls" to promotion out of League One via the play-offs in 2005. Loaned out to Yeovil Town, he switched to Oldham Athletic in 2006, before moving on to Port Vale in June 2007. He was loaned out to Gillingham, before joining Greek side Thrasyvoulos in 2008. He returned to England the following year with Welling United, later playing for Dover Athletic and Forest Green Rovers. He joined American club Sporting Kansas City in March 2010, and briefly played for the Missouri Comets in January 2012, before he returned to Thrasyvoulos. Born in England, he represented Grenada at international level.

Club career
After Queens Park Rangers went into administration in 2001, Rocastle dropped out of the professional game, joining up with Isthmian League side Kingstonian via Gravesend and Northfleet. He ended the season at Slough Town, making 13 Isthmian League Division One North appearances without scoring. He then signed with Premier League club Chelsea in 2003, although he did not make a first team appearance, appearing once as a non-playing substitute.

Rocastle made his debut in the English Football League on 14 February 2004, at the age of 22, playing for Barnsley in a 1–0 defeat at Wrexham's Racecourse Ground. He had joined the Yorkshiremen on loan and made another four Second Division appearances before leaving Oakwell the next month. In late-March he joined Third Division side Lincoln City on loan, but only made two substitute appearances before returning to Stamford Bridge before the end of the season.

He spent the first half of the 2004–05 season at Tony Mowbray's Hibernian, playing thirteen league games in a very successful season for the SPL club. The club had kept faith with the midfielder as he damaged a thigh muscle in September and was feared to have damaged knee ligaments in December, and were hopeful of acquiring him on a permanent basis. With no future with Chelsea, he instead joined Sheffield Wednesday on a free transfer in February 2005, signing a -year deal. His first senior goal came in a 3–2 win over Blackpool at Hillsborough on 12 March. He played for the "Owls" in the League One play-off final, which finished as a 4–2 victory over Hartlepool United at the Millennium Stadium in front of close to 60,000 spectators.

Rocastle played seventeen games of the club's 2005–06 Championship season, before going out on loan to League One side Yeovil Town in late-March. At the end of the season Rocastle's contract at Wednesday was terminated by mutual consent, and he quickly signed for Oldham Athletic. He played 35 league games in 2006–07, helping Oldham to a play-off place, though most of these appearances were as a substitute. In the play-offs they were defeated by eventual promotion winners Blackpool in the semi-finals.

In June 2007, he signed a two-year deal to join Port Vale. He was not a first team favourite in 2007–08, but did manage 21 starts and a goal against Cheltenham Town at Vale Park. He spent two weeks in January on loan with League One rivals Gillingham, playing two games for the "Gills". After talks with manager Lee Sinnott, his contract was terminated by mutual consent in April 2008.

Rocastle had a trial with Hibernian in May 2008, having impressed on loan there previously, but manager Mixu Paatelainen did not offer him a contract. Rocastle instead joined Thrasyvoulos Filis in the Superleague Greece. He made thirteen appearances for the club in 2008–09, though they finished bottom with a mere 14 points from 30 games and were relegated to the Football League.

Rocastle then joined Crewe Alexandra for a trial, but he failed to win a contract after playing 45 minutes in a pre-season friendly with Nantwich Town. He played for Aberdeen as a trialist in the Dean Windass testimonial match against Hull City, however he was not offered a contract by the club. In August 2009, he signed for Welling United, but left almost immediately after two Conference South appearances and joined Dover Athletic on a non-contract basis. He made his debut for Dover as a substitute in an 8–0 win over East Preston in the FA Cup. However, his stay at the Kent club was short, and in October 2009 he joined Forest Green Rovers on a non-contract basis. Rocastle impressed on his Forest Green debut, winning the man of the match award in Rovers 1–1 draw with Eastbourne Borough. He went on to make 15 appearances in the Conference National for Forest Green, before interest was shown in him by Swedish and American clubs.

Following a short trial in March 2010, Rocastle departed Forest Green to sign for Kansas City Wizards in Major League Soccer. He played 12 matches in 2010, however he was waived by Kansas City head coach Peter Vermes following the 2011 season on 23 November 2011. Six weeks later, on 4 January 2012, Rocastle signed with the Missouri Comets of the Major Indoor Soccer League. Ten days later he returned to Thrasyvoulos.

International career
Rocastle was eligible to play for both Grenada or Jamaica as his father was from Grenada and his mother was from Jamaica. He made his Grenada international debut on 26 November 2010, in a 2010 Caribbean Cup match against Martinique at the Stade d'Honneur de Dillon in Fort-de-France. He was named by coach Mike Adams in the 2011 CONCACAF Gold Cup at the United States, and played the first half of the 4–0 defeat to Jamaica at The Home Depot Center, before being taken off for Lancaster Joseph. Grenada exited the competition after finishing bottom of their group. On 15 November 2012, Rocastle scored from an indirect free-kick from 22 yards out in a 1–1 draw with French Guiana.

Personal life
He is a cousin of the late England and Arsenal midfielder David Rocastle.

Career statistics

Club

International

Honours
Sheffield Wednesday
League One play-offs: 2005

Notes

References

1981 births
Living people
Footballers from Lewisham
English sportspeople of Grenadian descent
Grenadian footballers
Grenada international footballers
Association football midfielders
Queens Park Rangers F.C. players
Ebbsfleet United F.C. players
Kingstonian F.C. players
Slough Town F.C. players
Chelsea F.C. players
Barnsley F.C. players
Lincoln City F.C. players
Hibernian F.C. players
Sheffield Wednesday F.C. players
Yeovil Town F.C. players
Oldham Athletic A.F.C. players
Port Vale F.C. players
Gillingham F.C. players
Expatriate footballers in Greece
Thrasyvoulos F.C. players
Welling United F.C. players
Dover Athletic F.C. players
Forest Green Rovers F.C. players
Expatriate soccer players in the United States
Sporting Kansas City players
Missouri Comets players
National League (English football) players
Isthmian League players
Major League Soccer players
Scottish Premier League players
English Football League players
Major Indoor Soccer League (2008–2014) players
2011 CONCACAF Gold Cup players
English expatriate sportspeople in the United States
English expatriate footballers
English footballers